Corethrovalva is a genus of moths in the family Gracillariidae. It has three currently known species, all from South Africa.

Species
Corethrovalva allophylina Vári, 1961
Corethrovalva goniosema Vári, 1961
Corethrovalva paraplesia Vári, 1961

References

External links
Global Taxonomic Database of Gracillariidae (Lepidoptera)

Acrocercopinae
Gracillarioidea genera